Jeudwine may refer to:

 George Jeudwine (1849–1933), English priest
 Hugh Jeudwine (1862–1942), British Army officer